The School of the Lion was an independent school based in Churcham, Gloucestershire. The school was founded in by 1987 by a group of Gloucestershire-based parents and taught male and female students aged 4 to 19.  The school closed in December 2013.  At the time of its last Ofsed inspection in 2010, it had 14 pupils.

History 
The school began in 1987 as a "parent co-operative", meeting in the afternoon in the homes of the families involved. The following year the school moved to Murray Hall in Tuffley, Gloucester, a Scout Hall which was rented for four and a half days a week. After years of considerable growth the school moved to a new premises in Gloucester city centre, the Judge's Lodgings in 1995. The building remained home to the school until 2005, when it relocated to Beauchamp House in Churcham, just outside Gloucester.

Education 
The School of the Lion used the Accelerated Christian Education curriculum rather than the UK's national curriculum. The qualifications gained through this system are accredited by the International Certificate for Christian Education (ICCE) Board as a similar standard to GCSE, AS-level and A-level. The curriculum uses individual workbooks (called PACEs) for each unit of work. At the end of each unit the student takes a test on which they must achieve a score of 80% or higher in order to advance to the next unit.

The school was separated into two learning centres based on the age and ability of students. Each learning centre had a supervisor, who provided academic assistance and motivation for students, and a monitor who performed administration tasks.

The School of the Lion was affiliated with Christian Education Europe, the central body for schools using the ACE curriculum in Europe. Older students competed in the European Student Convention. This yearly event is organised by CEE and features events in various categories including academics, art, drama, music and sport.

Inspections 
The School of the Lion was inspected by Ofsted in June 2010. The school was judged to be satisfactory or good in all areas, with pupil behaviour being recorded as outstanding.

References

External links 
The School of the Lion website
Beauchamp House website
ISBI entry for The School of the Lion
Churcham Village website - a joint project between senior school students and a local company
Ofsted page for School of the Lion
Christian Education Europe

1988 establishments in England
Defunct schools in Gloucestershire
Educational institutions established in 1988
2013 disestablishments in England
Educational institutions disestablished in 2013